Abderraouf bin Habib bin Yousef Jdey (Abd ar-Rawūf Jday) (also known as Farouk al-Tunisi and Al-Rauf Al-Jiddi) (born May 30, 1965) is a Canadian citizen, who was found swearing to die as a shaheed (martyr) on a series of videotapes found in the rubble of Mohammed Atef's house in Afghanistan in 2002.

The United States has issued three separate alerts that Jdey was about to attack inside the country, in January 2002, September 2003 and May 2004. Three years later, the United States announced that he was one of a handful of terrorists actively plotting to attack the country, although none of their predictions ever panned out.

Life

Jdey moved to Canada, using a false passport and seeking asylum, from Tunisia in 1991 and became a Canadian citizen in 1995.

He rented a Can$217 monthly apartment in Rosemont–La Petite-Patrie (a borough of Montreal), and studied biology at the Université de Montréal. In 1999, he wrote a pair of letters to unknown Muslims overseas, explaining how he found religion and speaking with contempt of the United States and United Nations.

American authorities allege that he "may" have trained at Mes Aynak alongside hijackers Khalid al-Mihdhar and Nawaf al-Hazmi in Afghanistan, before being assigned to a second wave of attacks. A letter written by Saif al-Adl, and later found by American forces, suggested that Jdey may have originally been slated to have participated in the original September 11 attacks

Jdey returned to Montreal in early 2001. Khalid Sheikh Mohamed, while being harshly interrogated, said that Jdey then backed out of the plan.  According to a 2010 Harvard report on al Qaeda by a former CIA officer, Jdey was detained in summer 2001 together with Zacarias Moussaoui.  Moussaoui was carrying textbooks on cropdusting; Jdey was carrying textbooks on biology.  Jdey was evidently subsequently released. In November 2001, he left Canada, several months after obtaining a replacement passport for one he'd received two years earlier which he claimed to have lost. He was believed to be bound for Europe.

November airline crash
Less than three months after the crash of American Airlines Flight 587 in Queens, New York, rumors were already suggesting that it had been destroyed by an unknown terrorist with a shoe bomb similar to the one found on Richard Reid.

Four months later, Mohammed Mansour Jabarah agreed to cooperate with American authorities in exchange for a reduced sentence. A known colleague of Khalid Sheikh Mohamed, he stated that Mohamed's lieutenant had told him that Reid and Jdey had both been enlisted by the al-Qaeda chief to carry out identical plots as part of a "second wave" of attacks against the United States.

United States 2002 claims

On January 14, 2002, a series of five videocassettes were recovered from the rubble of the destroyed home of Mohammad Atef outside of Kabul, Afghanistan. The tapes showed Jdey, Ramzi bin al-Shibh, Muhammad Sa'id Ali Hasan, Abd Al-Rahim, and Khalid Ibn Muhammad Al-Juhani vowing to die as martyrs.  It was the first time authorities had reason to suspect him of any wrongdoing. NBC News said the videos had been recorded after the Sept. 11 terrorist attacks.

Three days later, the FBI released to the public the first FBI Seeking Information – Terrorism list in order to profile the five wanted terrorists about whom very little was known, but who were suspected of plotting additional terrorist attacks in martyrdom operations. Already under fire for issuing "excessive and somewhat alarmist" warnings about terrorists plotting against the United States, Attorney General John Ashcroft stated that Jdey and Faker Boussora were likely traveling together and should be considered "extremely dangerous".

A month after Jdey and Boussora were declared fugitives, the Republic of Turkey announced that the pair may be within their borders.

Ramzi bin al-Shibh was interrogated at an American black site in 2003 about his knowledge of Jdey, and confessed that Jdey had been recruited by al-Qaeda. The following year Walid bin 'Attash, similarly interrogated under harsh circumstances at The Dark Prison, confirmed that Jdey had been known to him.

United States 2003 claims
In September 2003, the FBI issued an alert for four people they alleged "pose a threat to U.S. citizens", including Jdey, Adnan G. El Shukrijumah and the previously unknown Zubayr al-Rimi and Karim el-Mejjati.

United States 2004 claims
On May 26, 2004, Attorney General John Ashcroft and FBI Director Robert Mueller announced that reports indicated that Jdey was one of seven al-Qaeda members who were planning terrorist actions for the summer or fall of 2004. The other six named were Shukrijumah, Ahmed Khalfan Ghailani, Fazul Abdullah Mohammed, Amer El-Maati, Aafia Siddiqui and Adam Yahiye Gadahn.  American Democrats labeled the warning "suspicious" and said it was held solely to divert attention from President Bush's plummeting poll numbers and to push the failings of the Invasion of Iraq off the front page. CSIS director Reid Morden voiced similar concerns, saying it seemed more like "election year" politics, than an actual threat, and The New York Times pointed out that one day before the announcement, they had been told by the Department of Homeland Security that there were no current risks.

The day after the announcement, there was a reported sighting of Jdey and Shukrijumah at a Denny's restaurant in Colorado. The following year, another tip suggested that the pair had been seen driving a car with a Massachusetts license plate in Maine.

In April 2005, the U.S. State Department Rewards for Justice Program offered a reward of up to US$5 million for information leading to the capture of Jdey.

References

1965 births
Living people
Canadian al-Qaeda members
Individuals designated as terrorists by the United States government
People associated with the September 11 attacks
Tunisian al-Qaeda members
Tunisian emigrants to Canada